State Highway 43 (SH 43) is a State Highway in Kerala, India that starts in Muvattupuzha and ends in Theni Town (Tamil Nadu). The highway is 105 km long. The Route Starts from Chali Bridge at Muvattupuzha Connecting to NH 49 towards Kothamangalam.

The Route Map 
Muvattupuzha –Kalloorkad – Kodikulam – Udumbannoor- kaithappara - maniyarankudi- Idukki – Mariyapuram – Thankamony- Erattayar – Kattappana – Puliyanmala – Anyartholu- Chettukuzhi - Kuzhitholu - Cumbammettu – Cumbam - Theni

Districts connected by State Highway 
SH 43 goes through the Ernakulam and Idukki districts of Kerala State and the Theni district of Tamil Nadu State.

Townships on the State Highway 
Idukki, Kattappana and Cumbum are the major towns on the course of this State Highway

Strategic Importance 
When this State Highway is completed, This Route Will be a Shorter and Less Hilly Route to Reach Theni and Madurai in Tamil Nadu state from Cochin City. This Will bring developments to the High-Range (Hilly Region in Central Kerala) Regions of Idukki District as well as Easier, Shorter Way to Reach Thodupuzha Muvattupuzha and Ernakulam. This Route is Essentially a Hill Highway and is the shortest connection from Idukki to Thodupuzha or Moovattupuzha with least hairpins. The route connecting Udumbannoor and Maniyarankudi is still under construction. There is severe objection from the Forest dept since the 10 km route is through the forest land. Historically this SH is through the fort separating princely kingdoms of thekkumkur and vadakkumkur. After construction this will be the shortest and easiest access from high range heartland to reach Kerala townships of Thodupuzha, Kottayam and Ernakulam. There is a huge demand from people to complete the construction of this route immediately.

See also 
Roads in Kerala
List of State Highways in Kerala

References 

State Highways in Kerala
Roads in Ernakulam district
Roads in Idukki district